Prisoner is the 16th studio album by American singer-actress Cher, released on October 22, 1979 by Casablanca Records. The album was a commercial failure and failed to chart. "Hell on Wheels" was released as the lead single and had a moderate success, peaking at number fifty-nine on the Billboard Hot 100.

Album information
Prisoner (initially planned to be released under the title Mirror Image) was Cher's second album of 1979, and was released nine months after Take Me Home.

This was the last album of Cher's to date to be produced by Bob Esty, with Esty and Michelle Aller contributing several of the songs. Compared to the disco style of Take Me Home, Prisoner featured a relatively new wave sound. Prisoner also marked the first time that Cher released an album which featured songs that were written exclusively for her.

The producer wanted to take advantage of Cher's image and the media obsession with her. On the front cover of the album, she appears to be completely naked, with long hair draped to cover her breasts.  She is wrapped in chains and wearing a wide metal collar.  Her wrists and ankles are tightly shackled with wide metal bands.  The cover spurred controversy among some women's rights groups for her perceived "sex slave" image.

Originally the album was planned to be titled Mirror Image, pointing out Cher's known brave side and her newly found 'wild disco' side. Since Cher wasn't really into the album (she wanted to "rock out") she kept on refusing songs on one hand and adding songs on the other hand. "Boys & Girls", a more rock-based song was added by Cher. Since there was nothing left from the album's original plan, the title was changed into Prisoner before release.

Prisoner has been released on CD together with the first Casablanca Records album Take Me Home, in a CD entitled, The Casablanca Years. This CD unites all the tracks from both albums, merging them onto one single CD.

Promotion
Cher recorded an exclusive TV special called Cher...and Other Fantasies, featuring sketches, the unreleased tracks "Like a Number", a new version of "More than You Know" and the song "Ain't Nobody's Business" which was performed in the Take Me Home Tour.

Singles
"Hell on Wheels", the lead single from the album reached only number fifty-nine on the Billboard Hot 100. To promote the single a video was filmed. In it, Cher was featured wearing roller skates being followed by some truckers. The song was also included in the original soundtrack to the film, Roller Boogie.

"Holdin' Out For Love" was released in Japan as a promotional single, and in the UK as a commercial 7", which failed to chart.

Track listing

Personnel
Cher – main vocals
Michelle Aller, Arnold McCuller, Luther Vandross, Ginger Blake, Laura Creamer, Linda Dillard – background vocals
Richard Tee – Hammond B3 organ
Jeff Porcaro, Alvin Taylor, Rick Shlosser, Mike Baird – drums
Kim Hutchcroft – flute, saxophone
Gary Herbig – saxophone
Bill Reichenbach Jr. – trombone
John Pierce – bass guitar
David Williams, Robby Krieger, Steve Lukather, Ira Newborn, Joey Brasler – guitar
Tom Snow – keyboards
David Paich – piano
John Hobbs – piano, Hammond organ
Dan Wyman – synthesizer, programming
Bob Esty – piano, synthesizer, background vocals, string arrangements
Victor Feldman – timpani, tambourine
Paulinho Da Costa, Larry Emerine, Alan Estes, Oliver C. Brown – percussion
Jerry Hey – horn arrangements
Sid Sharp – concertmaster

Technical
Larry Emerine – co-producer, engineer
Harry Langdon – photography

References

External links

1979 albums
Cher albums
Casablanca Records albums